Luis A. Gonzalez is an American attorney who served as Presiding Justice of the Appellate Division of the Supreme Court, First Judicial Department in New York from 2009–2015.

Early life and education
Gonzalez was born in Manati, Puerto Rico and raised in Hell's Kitchen, Manhattan in a family of seven.
His father had been a carpenter in Puerto Rico and worked in a candy factory in New York. His mother was a homemaker.  He is a 1968 graduate of Eastern Mennonite University and a 1975 graduate of Columbia Law School.

Legal career
From 1978 to 1980, Gonzalez was General Counsel for the Commonwealth of Puerto Rico from 1978 to 1980. He served on the New York City Civil Court as Housing Court Judge from 1985 to 1986 and a Civil Court Judge from 1987 to 1992. He was a New York Supreme Court Justice, 12th Judicial District, from 1992 to 2002. He was designated a Justice for the Appellate Division, First Judicial Department by Governor George E. Pataki in 2002 and Presiding Justice of that court in 2009 by Governor David Paterson. He was the first person of Puerto Rican descent to hold the position of Presiding Justice.

See also
List of Hispanic/Latino American jurists

Further reading
 Paterson, David (2020). Black, Blind, & in Charge: A Story of Visionary Leadership and Overcoming Adversity. New York: Skyhorse Publishing.

References

Living people
New York (state) lawyers
Eastern Mennonite University alumni
Columbia Law School alumni
American people of Puerto Rican descent
Hispanic and Latino American judges
People from Manatí, Puerto Rico
Year of birth missing (living people)